The 2018–19 Indonesian Basketball League is the fourth season of the Starting5 as a promoter of the league. The regular season began on 30 November 2018 until 17 February 2019, with the Playoffs starting on 1 until 23 March 2019. The Pre-Season was held on 14 until 21 October 2018.

Teams

Schedule

Transactions

Foreign Players 
Each club in the first divisions will be allowed up to three registered foreign players, excluding one foreign-born player who has become a naturalized Indonesian citizen. Two foreign players will be allowed on the court. Naturalized players can play as Indonesian citizens and have no limitations. Each club will be allowed one naturalized player.

IBL Draft Local Player

1st round

2nd round

Undrafted Players

Preseason 
All games held in Sritex Arena, Solo

Preliminary round 
All times are local (UTC+7).

Red Group

White Group

Classification round

7th-8th-place game

5th-6th-place game

Finals round

Semi-finals

3rd-4th-place game

Final

Individual awards

Regular season 
All times are local (UTC+7).

Red Division

White Division

Statistics

Individual game highs

Individual statistic

Individual awards 
MVP Player : Kaleb Ramot Gemilang (Stapac Jakarta)

Foreign Player of the Year : Madarious Gibbs (Satya Wacana Salatiga)

Most Inspiration Young Player of the Year :

Rookie of the Year : Agassi Goantara (Stapac Jakarta)

Coach of the Year : Wahyu Widayat Jati (NSH Jakarta)

Defensive Player of the Year : Michael Vigilance Jr. (Bogor Siliwangi)

Sixthman of the Year : Abraham Damar Grahita (Stapac Jakarta)

Most Improve Player of the Year : Widyanta Putra Teja (Stapac Jakarta)

2018-19 All-Indonesian Team

 Andre Rorimpandey PG (NSH Jakarta)
 Abraham Damar Grahita SG (Stapac Jakarta)
 Kaleb Ramot Gemilang SF (Stapac Jakarta)
 Muhammad Hardian Wicaksono PF (Pacific Caesar Surabaya)
 Yanuar Dwi Priasmoro C (Bima Perkasa Jogja)

2018-19 All-Rookie Team 

 Daniel Anggoro PG (Satya Wacana Salatiga)
 Samuel Pelmelay SG (NSH Jakarta)
 Agassi Goantara SF (Stapac Jakarta)
  SG/SF
  C

All-Star Games

Pre-game 
Skill-challenge champion :  Kaleb Ramot Gemilang (Stapac Jakarta)

Three-point contest champion :  Andakara Prastawa (Pelita Jaya)

Slam-dunk contest champion :  Savon Goodman (Stapac Jakarta)

Game

Red Team

White Team

All-Star MVP

Playoffs

Bracket 
The whole playoffs are in a best-of-three series.

First round 
All games held from 1 and 2 March 2019, in Hi-Test Arena, Batam

Red Division

Bima Perkasa Jogja vs. Satria Muda Pertamina Jakarta

White Division

Pelita Jaya Jakarta vs. Pacific Caesar Surabaya

Semi finals 
All games held from 8 to 10 March 2019, in Soemantri Brodjonegoro Indoor Stadium, Jakarta

Red Division

NSH Jakarta vs. Satria Muda Pertamina Jakarta

White Division

Stapac Jakarta vs. Pacific Caesar Surabaya

Finals

Stapac Jakarta vs. Satria Muda Pertamina Jakarta

Finals MVP

References

External links 

 Official Website

2018–19 in Asian basketball leagues
2019 in Indonesian sport
Basketball in Indonesia